Henry Charles Whitley CVO (1906–1976) was a Church of Scotland minister and an author.

He was born on 20 March 1906 and educated at George Heriot's School and the University of Edinburgh, where he gained a Ph.D. in 1953. He was Minister of Newark Parish Church (in Port Glasgow), Old Partick Parish Church and the High Kirk of Edinburgh; and a World War II chaplain with the Seaforth Highlanders.  He was Dean of the Thistle from 1969 to 1974 and died on 8 May 1976. He is buried in Southwick Kirkyard in Dumfriesshire.

Notes

1906 births
People educated at George Heriot's School
Alumni of the University of Edinburgh
20th-century Ministers of the Church of Scotland
Royal Army Chaplains' Department officers
Deans of the Thistle
Commanders of the Royal Victorian Order
1976 deaths
Scottish military chaplains
World War II chaplains
Ministers of St Giles' Cathedral